Jennifer Lynch is an American politician serving as a member of the Montana House of Representatives for the 73rd district. Elected in November 2022, she assumed office on January 2, 2023.

Career 
Outside of politics, Lynch is a teacher and the negotiating chairperson of the Butte Teacher’s Union. She was elected to the Montana House of Representatives in November 2022 and assumed office on January 2, 2023.

References 

Living people
Montana Democrats
Members of the Montana House of Representatives
Women state legislators in Montana
People from Butte, Montana
People from Silver Bow County, Montana
Educators from Montana
Year of birth missing (living people)